Klamath River is an unincorporated community in Siskiyou County, California, United States, situated on the Klamath River. It is located on State Route 96, near the Oregon border. The name "Klamath" was derived from an Indian word Tlamatl which means "they of the (Klamath) river," from /-matl/ "river." in Chinook. The population is 190. In 2022, a forest fire destroyed most of the structures in the town.

History 
The Klamath River area was home to the Hupa (Hoopa), Karuk, Modoc, and Yurok Indian tribes. Native Americans relied on the river for its abundance of salmon and trout.

The California Gold Rush of 1848–1855 brought many miners to the Klamath River watershed. The miners caused disruption in the lives of the Native Americans of the area by damming and diverting water for mining purposes, which made it difficult for spawning salmon and other fish populations to survive. There are remnants of old mining sites along the river. The town of Happy Camp, first settled in 1851, was named for its fruitful yields of gold. The Klamath River was used by the Quicksilver Mining Co. in the late 19th century where they extracted mercury and cinnabar located up Beaver Creek. Tunnels that were dug to extract gold were later used by bootleggers of whiskey.

In 2022, the McKinney Fire destroyed most of the structures in the town, leaving only a handful of homes.

Wildlife and the environment 
Klamath River hosts the largest deer herd in California, and the largest concentrations of ducks and geese on the North American continent. There are also many black bear, elk, bobcat, mountain lion, raccoon, quail, grouse, pheasant, squirrel, kit fox, river otter, beaver, badger, porcupine, weasel, skunks, coyotes, a variety of toads and frogs, blue herons, bald and American eagles, along with over 200 species of birds. Historically, the Klamath River was the third largest salmon water-shed on the west coast.

References

External links
Klamath River, California history

Unincorporated communities in California
Unincorporated communities in Siskiyou County, California